"Rose's Turn" is a song from the musical Gypsy. It has been performed by such actresses as Bette Midler, Ethel Merman, Angela Lansbury, Tyne Daly, Patti LuPone, Bernadette Peters, and Imelda Staunton. The song is often regarded as the pinnacle of the eleven o'clock number.

Synopsis
The song "occurs at the point when Mama Rose realizes the frustrations of having little to show for the sacrifices that have left her with two seemingly ungrateful children." At this point in the show, Mama Rose is "a character whose dreams were too strong and whose heart held her own feelings hostage to make those dreams come true." She "finally drops her facade and admits her frustration and despair." Pittsburgh Post-Gazette argues the "unmasking of her psyche" takes place during the song.

Production
The song was written by Jule Styne with lyrics by Stephen Sondheim. As the finale, it contains a number of callbacks to songs from earlier in the show. Bette Midler, who performed the show in the television movie, said the song is her favorite piece from the show: "It's a terrifying piece of music because it's one of the two most famous arias in the musical comedy lexicon, the other being 'Soliloquy' from Carousel."

Critical reception
Chicago magazine described it as "show-stopping." Michael Kuchwara, notable theater critic for the Associated Press, described it as a "blazing finale." The Hour named it a "showstopping tour-de-force." The Spokesman-Review wrote the song "may not match the other songs for lyrics and melodic value, but its emotional effect is riveting", and described it as a "magical moment." Boca Raton News names it a "torch song" and the "dramatic high point." Toledo Blade wrote "when [Mama Rose] sings 'Rose's Turn', a touching reflection of who she is and what she gave up for her daughters, we finally understand the passions that drove her." Kuchwara in another AP review called it a "stunning musical soliloquy," adding "it's here where Rose pours out her true feelings, letting the rage and frustration of a stymied life explode."

References

1959 songs
Songs from Gypsy (musical)
Songs with music by Jule Styne
Songs written by Stephen Sondheim